Gregory Allen Thayer (born October 23, 1949) is a former pitcher in Major League Baseball. He played for the Minnesota Twins in 1978.

References

External links

1949 births
Living people
Major League Baseball pitchers
Minnesota Twins players
Baseball players from Iowa
Sportspeople from Cedar Rapids, Iowa
St. Cloud State Huskies baseball players
Sportspeople from St. Cloud, Minnesota
Decatur Commodores players
Great Falls Giants players
Knoxville Blue Jays players
Orlando Twins players
Syracuse Chiefs players
Tacoma Twins players
Toledo Mud Hens players
Baseball players from Minnesota